Terellia volgensis is a species of tephritid or fruit flies in the genus Terellia of the family Tephritidae.

Distribution
Russia.

References

Tephritinae
Insects described in 1995
Diptera of Europe